Spaxton is a small village and civil parish on the Quantocks in the Sedgemoor district of Somerset, South West England.

History

Spaxton was part of the hundred of Cannington.

The modern parish includes the ancient parishes of Aisholt and Charlynch. Aisholt is one of the Thankful Villages - those villages that suffered no fatalities during the Great War of 1914–1918.

The name of Spaxton originates from "Spakr", a Dane who settled in the area in about the 9th century. An alternative derivation relies on it being recorded as Spacheston in the Domesday Book, meaning 'The councillor's enclosure', from the Old English spæcas and tun. It was the property of Alfred of Spain.

During the 19th century, Henry James Prince, former curate of Charlynch founded the notorious religious cult of the Agapemone at Four Forks.

Governance

The parish council has responsibility for local issues, including setting an annual precept (local rate) to cover the council's operating costs and producing annual accounts for public scrutiny. The parish council evaluates local planning applications and works with the local police, district council officers, and neighbourhood watch groups on matters of crime, security, and traffic. The parish council's role also includes initiating projects for the maintenance and repair of parish facilities, as well as consulting with the district council on the maintenance, repair, and improvement of highways, drainage, footpaths, public transport, and street cleaning. Conservation matters (including trees and listed buildings) and environmental issues are also the responsibility of the council.

The village falls within the Non-metropolitan district of Sedgemoor, which was formed on 1 April 1974 under the Local Government Act 1972, having previously been part of Bridgwater Rural District, which is responsible for local planning and building control, local roads, council housing, environmental health, markets and fairs, refuse collection and recycling, cemeteries and crematoria, leisure services, parks, and tourism.

Somerset County Council is responsible for running the largest and most expensive local services such as education, social services, libraries, main roads, public transport, policing and fire services, trading standards, waste disposal and strategic planning.

It is also part of the Bridgwater and West Somerset county constituency represented in the House of Commons of the Parliament of the United Kingdom. It elects one Member of Parliament (MP) by the first past the post system of election.

Geography

Near the village is Hawkridge Reservoir which supplies water for Bridgwater, constructed between 1960 and 1962, and the Ashford Reservoir which was constructed in 1932.

Landmarks and Notable Buildings

 Gothelney Hall at Gothelney Green was built in the 15th century and has been designated as a Grade I listed building. 
 Barford Park is in the South of the parish.
 Parts of Court Farm near St Margaret's Church date from c.1500

Religious sites

 The Church of St Margaret has some parts from the 12th and 13th centuries but is predominantly from the 15th century, and was restored in 1895. It has been designated by English Heritage as a Grade I listed building.
 The Church of All Saints, Aisholt dates from the 14th and 15th centuries.
 In Charlynch (or Charlinch) the Church of St Mary has been deconsecrated.
 The Methodist Chapel is on the main road through the village.

Gallery

References

External links

 Bygone Spaxton
 Spaxton Parish Council
 Spaxton information from British History Online
 Charlinch at British History Online
 
 

Villages in Sedgemoor
Civil parishes in Somerset